Joseph Nicholas Keohane (18 August 1918 – 5 January 1988) was an Irish Gaelic football manager, selector and former player. His league and championship career at senior level with the Kerry county team spanned thirteen seasons from 1936 to 1948.

Personal life
Born in Boherbee Tralee, County Kerry. He was the son of John Keohane, sergeant in the Munster Fusiliers, and Babs Keohane (née Doocey). Educated at Tralee CBS, on leaving school he joined the Civil Service in the Department of Lands. He later worked as a manager in the Dingle Fisherman's Co-op.

Army career
In 1941 he resigned from the Civil Service to join the Irish Army during The Emergency (Ireland). He spent time braced in Renmore Barracks (Dún Uí Mhaoilíosa) in Galway. Having attained the rank of Captain, he retired voluntarily from the army in 1960.

He continued to hold his commission as a reserve, and was called up for service again in 1969, soon after the outbreak of violence in Northern Ireland.

Court-martialled in 1972 on charges of fraudulently misapplying ammunition, he was defended by Seán MacBride, who argued that it was common in the army to accumulate ‘buckshee’ ammunition for additional practice for shooting teams. Found guilty on nine of thirteen charges, he was fined £25 and severely reprimanded. The leniency of the sentence may have been influenced by character references provided by Tom Barry and Kevin Boland. Retiring fully from the army later in 1972.

Political career
Keohane was a long time supporter of Irish republicanism. He stood as an Independent candidate in the 1973 Irish general election in the Kerry North constituency, representing Aontacht Éireann. He obtained 695 votes coming last in the poll.

Club career
By his late teens he had established himself as a key member of the John Mitchels senior team. In a twenty-year club career Keohane won three county senior championship medals with the Tralee club in 1937, 1947 and 1952. He was captain of the 1947 winning side.

He also lined out with the Geraldines club in Dublin.

Underage career
Keohane made his debut on the inter-county scene at the age of seventeen when he was selected on the Kerry minor team in 1936. He played one championship season with the minor team, and ended his tenure in this grade as an All-Ireland runner-up.

Senior career
He was still a member of the minor team when he made his senior debut during the 1936 championship in the Munster Senior Football Championship final win over Clare where he lined out at full back. It was his only game of the championship.

Over the course of the next thirteen seasons, Keohane would be Kerry's regular full back.

Keohane was full back for all three of his sides Munster championship games in 1937. Wins over Cork by 6-07 to 0-04 and Tipperary 2-11 to 0-04 set up another Munster final with Clare. Kerry kept up their good form and powered to a 4-09 to 1-01 win and a second Munster title for Keohane. In his first All-Ireland semi-final Keohane and co faced Leinster champions Laois in Cork. In the end the sides ended level on a 2-03 each scoreline. The sides met again in Waterford and this time it was the Kerrymen who won out on a 2-02 to 1-04 scoreline. This set up an All-Ireland final date with Cavan. On what was the young Tralee mans first senior outing in Croke Park the sides ended level on a 2-05 each scoreline. In the replay Kerry had too much for the Ulstermen and won out on a 4-04 to 1-07 scoreline. Giving Keohane his first All-Ireland medal.

Kerry picked up where they left off in 1938 with wins over Clare 2-06 to 0-01 and Tipperary 2-06 to 1-03 to qualify for the Munster final. In the final Kerry faced Cork in Clonakilty. Keohane won his third Munster title in a row thanks to a big 4-14 to 0-06 win. For the second season in a row Keohane and co faced Leinster champions Laois in the All-Ireland semi-final. It was another close game but the Kingdom came out the right side of a 2-06 to 2-04 scoreline. In the final Kerry faced Galway. Like the year before the sides ended level 2-06 each and needed a replay. The replay wasn't to be plain sailing for anyone involved. A despite over expenses led to Keohane not playing in the game and was replaced by young Paddy ‘Bawn’ Brosnan. There was confusion at the end of the game when many thought the referee Peter Waters had blown the full time  whistle with Galway leading. Thinking that he had blown for full-time the jubilant Galway supporters invaded the pitch. It took all of twenty minutes to clear the pitch but only then did the real problems come to light. Jerry O’Leary Chairman of the Kerry Selection Committee outlined their dilemma.Many of the Kerry players couldn't be found. So Keohane who was in the Croke Park stands took to the field. Kerry managed to re-field even if the team which played out the remaining minutes bore little resemblance to the starting fifteen. In the end the title went to Galway on a 2-04 to 0-07 scoreline.

Keohane was back in the team for the 1939 Munster championship. The final with Tipperary, Kerry had a bye into the final, was Keohane's only where he didn't line out at Full Back, he played at Left Corner Back as he picked up his fourth Munster title.  The All-Ireland semi-final see Kerry face Mayo. For the second season in a three the semi-final ended in a draw on a 0-04 each scoreline. The Munstermen made no mistake second time around on a 3-08 to 1-04 scoreline. The win seen Keohane line out in his third All-Ireland final in a row and this time Kerry faced Meath. A clash of colours seen Kerry line out in red and while jerseys, the colours of county champions Dingle, for the game. In the end Kerry came out the right side of a close 2-05 to 2-03 scoreline and give Keohane his second All-Ireland medal.

1940 seen Keohane pick up his fifth Munster title after wins over Limerick 4-09 to 1-02. Tipperary 4-08 to 1-05 and a novel win over Waterford 1-10 to 0-06 in the final. The All-Ireland semi final Kerry faced Cavan in Croke Park. Goals were the difference as Keohane and co ran out winners on a 3-04 to 0-08 win. Kerry were back in the All-Ireland final where they faced Galway in a repeat of the 1938 final. While for many reasons Kerry and Keohane wouldn't have good memories of that game it wasn't the case this time. Keohane won his third All-Ireland by the bare minimum on a 0-07 to 1-03 scoreline.

Kerry had a bye into the 1941 Munster final where they faced Clare. A 2-09 to 0-06 win seen Keohane pick up his sixth Munster title. In the All-Ireland semi-final it was a Munster v Leinster clash as the Kerrymen faced Dublin. In a low scoring game the sides ended level 0-04 each. In the replay Kerry made no mistake and won out 2-09 to 0-03. For the third time in four seasons Kerry faced Galway in the All-Ireland final. A 1-08 to 0-07 win saw a fourth All-Ireland medal for Keohane.

In 1942 Koehane won his seventh Munster title in a row after a first win over Cork since 1938 in the Munster final. Kerry faced foes Galway once more, this time in the All-Ireland semi-final. In a low scoring game it was the men from the West won out on a 1-03 to 0-03 scoreline.

In 1943 Kerry faced Cork in the Munster semi-final. The sides ended level 0-09 each at full time in Cork. The replay would see Keohane suffer his only Munster championship loss as his side fell to a 1-05 to 1-04 loss.

After the setback of 1943 Keohane was back for the 1944 Munster final where Kerry faced Tipperary. A 1-06 to 0-05 win see him win his seventh Munster title. In the All-Ireland semi-final there was a novel meeting between Kerry and Carlow. Goals were the difference as Keohane and co won out 3-03 to 0-10. The All-Ireland final was another novel pairing as Kerry faced holders Roscommon. The title went back West as the Rossies won on a 1-09 to 2-04 scoreline.

Keohane missed out on the whole 1945 season. Where Kerry failed to retain their Munster title for the second time in three seasons.

He played no part during the 1946 Munster championship as Kerry retook the title. He returned for the All-Ireland semi-final as Kerry faced Ulster champions Antrim. In a close game it was Keohane and co who came out on top after a 2-07 to 0-10 win. The final was a repeat of 1944 where Kerry again faced Reocommon who were going for three titles in four seasons. The title looked to being heading West once more as Roscommon had a six-point lead with three minutes left, but Kerry made an amazing comeback with goals by Paddy Burke and Tom "Gega" O Connor seeing the game end 2-04 each. In the replay Burke and O'Connor also scored late goals as the Kingdom took the title on a 2-08 to 0-10 scoreline. It was Keohanes fifth and final All-Ireland medal.

By 1947 Keohane was in the twilight of his career. Despite this wins over Clare 9-10 to 0-04 and Cork 3-08 to 2-06 seen him pick up his ninth Munster title. He was at full back as Kerry got the better of Meath in the All-Ireland semi-final. This setup arguably the most famous All-Ireland football final of all time with Cavan. For the first, and likely last time, the All-Ireland final was played outside Ireland. The game was played in the Polo Grounds in New York City,  to cater for the large Irish-American community there. The New York final was also intended to observe the centenary of the Great Famine that triggered mass Irish emigration to the U.S. and other countries. The Cavan team flew via the Azores, taking 30 hours. Kerry's trip by Ocean Liner took far longer. Cavan travelled by air and Kerry by sea. The Cavan team flew via the Azores, taking 30 hours. Kerry's trip by Ocean Liner took far longer. In the end the title would go to the Ulstermen on a 2-11 to 2-07. The game would turn out to be his last All-Ireland final with Kerry.

In 1948 after over 10 years playing at senior level Keohane was made captain of the Kerry team for the first time. He had the honor of being captain as he picked up his tenth and final Munster title after another final with over old foes Cork. However there was to be no fairy tail ending as Kerry slumped to a 0-13 to 0-03 loss to Mayo in the All-Ireland semi-final in what was Keohanes 44th and final game in the Green and Gold.

Railway Cup

After being chosen on the Munster inter-provincial team for the first time in 1938, Keohane was an automatic choice on the starting fifteen for much of his inter-county career. During that time he won two Railway Cup medals.

Management

In retirement from playing Keohane became involved in team management and coaching. He served as manager, trainer and selector with the Kerry senior team at various times between 1969 and 1988 and helped guide Kerry through a period in which they won twenty three major honours. These include nine All-Ireland Championships, including a record-equalling four-in-a-row between 1978 and 1981 and a three-in-a-row between 1984 and 1986, eleven Munster Championships and three National Leagues, including two league-championship doubles.

Awards

Keohane was posthumously named in the full-back position on the Football Team of the Millennium in 1999, and selected on a list of the 125 greatest Gaelic footballers of all time in a 2009 poll.

References

 

1918 births
1988 deaths
Gaelic football backs
Gaelic football managers
Gaelic football selectors
Irish sportsperson-politicians
John Mitchels (Kerry) Gaelic footballers
Kerry inter-county Gaelic footballers
Munster inter-provincial Gaelic footballers
Winners of five All-Ireland medals (Gaelic football)